Doris Louisa Aikenhead (née Strachan, 13 January 1917 – 12 November 1974) was a New Zealand track and field athlete who represented her country at the 1938 British Empire Games.

Early life and family
Born Doris Louisa Strachan in Timaru on 13 January 1917, Aikenhead was the daughter of Julia McInnes Strachan (née Crisp) and James Dunn Strachan. She went on to marry Andrew Aikenhead.

Athletics

She was also a member of the New Zealand trio that finished fourth in the women's 440 yards relay.

Death
Aikenhead died on 12 November 1974, and she was buried at Oamaru Lawn Cemetery.

References

1917 births
1974 deaths
Sportspeople from Timaru
New Zealand female long jumpers
Commonwealth Games competitors for New Zealand
Athletes (track and field) at the 1938 British Empire Games
New Zealand female sprinters